László Háy (31 August 1891, in Jászberény – 27 January 1975, in Budapest) was a Hungarian economist, physician and politician, who served as Governor of the Hungarian National Bank during the Communist regime from 17 April to 20 November 1956. He functioned as Minister of External Trade between 1954 and 1956. He was a member of the Hungarian Academy of Sciences (MTA).

After the fall of the Hungarian Soviet Republic he emigrated to Austria then Czechoslovakia. After that he lived in Germany and joined to the Communist Party of Germany. After that he worked in the Soviet Union. He returned to Hungary in 1945.

Works
 Az újratermelési ciklus alakulása a második világháború után (Budapest, 1959)
 A hidegháború gazdasági formái (Budapest, 1964)
 A világkapitalizmus válsága (Budapest, 1966)
 A megváltozott világgazdaság (Budapest, 1970)

See also
National Bank of Hungary

External links
Hungarian Biographical Lexicon 
Éva Bárány-Szabadkai: Háy László. In: Magyar közgazdászok arcképvázlatai (ed. István Mihalik). Budapest, Neumann Kht., 2005.

1891 births
1975 deaths
Hungarian economists
Hungarian communists
Government ministers of Hungary
Governors of the Hungarian National Bank
Communist Party of Germany politicians
Hungarian emigrants to Austria
Hungarian expatriates in Germany
Hungarian expatriates in the Soviet Union
Hungarian Jews
People from Jászberény
Jewish Hungarian politicians